WUBR (910 AM) is a radio station licensed to serve Baton Rouge, Louisiana, United States. The station is owned by Ana and Freddy Cruz, through licensee Power 102.1 FM LLC. It used to air a Gospel music format but as of November 7, 2007 the station is listed as "licensed and silent" in the FCC database.

The station was assigned the WUBR call letters by the Federal Communications Commission on March 21, 2006.

History
910 AM was originally WLCS, a very successful Top 40 outlet and affiliate with ABC Radio. WLCS signed on November 1, 1946, taking the ABC affiliation from WJBO and was owned by AirWaves Inc.  Originally broadcasting on a frequency of 1400 kHz, the station moved to 910 kHz in 1951.  It remained an ABC radio affiliate until 1956.  By the early 1970s, the station became a Top 40 outlet, and in 1978, affiliated with UPI Radio.  In 1984 it changed owners, going from Airwaves, Inc. (along with sister stations WQXY-FM in Baton Rouge and KQXY-FM in Beaumont, Texas) to Oppenheimer Broadcast Group of Austin, Texas. On September 1, 1984, WLCS changed its calls to WXAM and changed its traditional Contemporary Hit Radio format to satellite-delivered big band and oldies. It changed hands again in 1988 to Vetter Communications, which owned local NBC TV affiliate WVLA-TV) with call letters WTGE.  In 1989 the station changed hands again to Church Point Ministries, call letters to WNDC, and flipped to gospel, but financial problems have resulted in taking the station off the air in 2004.

The station first went silent on October 22, 2004 then resumed broadcasting in October 2005 for a period ending November 16, 2005. The station stayed silent until broadcast operations again resumed on November 12, 2006 then ended again 3 days later. WUBR was again silent until November 6, 2007 but again went silent a day later. FCC rules may force forfeiture of a commercial broadcast license if a station is silent for one full year and these silent periods are just under that limit.

In August 2012 Pelican Broadcasting began management of the station.  Local sports programs by Jordy Hultberg, Buddy Songy and Tommy Krysan are in the weekday line up.  Fox Sports Radio was the national affiliate at first, then in May 2014, it became affiliated with CBS Sports Radio.

Construction permit
On September 7, 2007, WUBR was granted a construction permit to relocate their transmitter to 30°38'07"N, 91°09'55"W with a change in daytime power to 1,200 watts and nighttime power to 51 watts. In FCC filings, station ownership stated that they have lost access to their currently licensed transmitter site except for brief periods of broadcasting required to maintain their license. This construction permit expires on March 23, 2009. As of early 2010, the new transmitter site located in Zachary, Louisiana has been finished and the site is currently operating a temporary format while awaiting a format proposed by their affiliated church.

References

External links
Official website

Radio stations in Louisiana
Sports radio stations in the United States
Radio stations established in 1946
CBS Sports Radio stations
1946 establishments in Louisiana